Log is a rural locality (a village) in Gorod Vyazniki, Vyaznikovsky District, Vladimir Oblast, Russia. The population was 34 as of 2010.

Geography 
Log is located 11 km east of Vyazniki (the district's administrative centre) by road. Rudelevo is the nearest rural locality.

References 

Rural localities in Vyaznikovsky District